Cal Stevenson (born September 12, 1996) is an American professional baseball outfielder for the Oakland Athletics of Major League Baseball (MLB). He made his MLB debut in 2022.

Career
Stevenson attended John F. Kennedy High School in Fremont, California. In 2014, he attended the University of Nevada, Reno, where he played college baseball for the Nevada Wolfpack. He transferred to Chabot Junior College for 2015 and then to the University of Arizona. In 2016, he played collegiate summer baseball with the Cotuit Kettleers of the Cape Cod Baseball League.

Toronto Blue Jays
The Toronto Blue Jays selected Stevenson in the 10th round of the 2018 MLB draft. Stevenson split his debut campaign between the rookie-level Gulf Coast Blue Jays and the Bluefield Blue Jays, hitting .369/.511/.523 with 2 home runs, 31 RBI, and 21 stolen bases. He began the 2019 season with the High-A Dunedin Blue Jays, batting .298/.388/.393 with 5 home runs, 50 RBI, and 11 stolen bases in 90 games.

Houston Astros
On July 31, 2019, the Blue Jays traded Stevenson, Aaron Sanchez, and Joe Biagini to the Houston Astros for Derek Fisher. He played in 23 games for the High-A Fayetteville Woodpeckers down the stretch, posting a slash of .247/.390/.346 with no home runs and 9 RBI.

Tampa Bay Rays
On January 9, 2020, the Astros traded Stevenson and Peyton Battenfield to the Tampa Bay Rays for Austin Pruitt. Stevenson did not play in a game in 2020 due to the cancellation of the minor league season because of the COVID-19 pandemic.

Stevenson spent the 2021 season with the Double-A Montgomery Biscuits, slashing .254/.368/.403 with 9 home runs, 41 RBI, and 17 stolen bases in 94 games. He began the 2022 season with the Triple-A Durham Bulls, playing in 57 games and hitting .265/.376/.353 with 2 home runs, 17 RBI, and 9 stolen bases.

Oakland Athletics
On July 9, 2022, the Rays traded Stevenson and Christian Fernandez to the Oakland Athletics for Christian Bethancourt. He was assigned to the Triple-A Las Vegas Aviators upon being acquired.

The Athletics promoted Stevenson to the major leagues for the first time on August 10.

References

External links

Living people
1996 births
People from Fremont, California
Baseball players from California
Major League Baseball outfielders
Oakland Athletics players
Chabot Gladiators baseball players
Nevada Wolf Pack baseball players
Arizona Wildcats baseball players
Duluth Huskies players
Cotuit Kettleers players
Gulf Coast Blue Jays players
Bluefield Blue Jays players
Dunedin Blue Jays players
Fayetteville Woodpeckers players
Montgomery Biscuits players
Durham Bulls players
Las Vegas Aviators players